Elizabeth Puranam is an Al Jazeera anchor, journalist and India correspondent.

Biography
Puranam worked at TVNZ (Television New Zealand) and the news desk at TV3 (now Three). She can read and write in Arabic and can speak Hindi and Telugu.

Puranam was born at the Mahatma Gandhi Hospital in Hyderabad, India. She moved to Auckland with her family when she was 10, first settling in Avondale, then Glen Eden, and finally Piha (West Auckland). Whilst living in Auckland, Puranam earned a BA in political science and media.

Personal life 
On 14 August 2021, Puranam married French sports agent Alexandre Bernard who she met in Doha. Puranam gave birth to their son, Mathis Charles Puranam-Bernard on 16 June 2022. Puranam lives with her family in south Delhi.

References

External links
 
 

Living people
Place of birth missing (living people)
People from Hyderabad, India
Indian emigrants to New Zealand
Al Jazeera people
New Zealand television newsreaders and news presenters
Women television journalists
1984 births